The arrondissement of Sarreguemines is an arrondissement of France in the Moselle department in the Grand Est region. It has 83 communes.

Composition

The communes of the arrondissement of Sarreguemines, and their INSEE codes, are:

 Achen (57006)
 Baerenthal (57046)
 Bettviller (57074)
 Bining (57083)
 Bitche (57089)
 Bliesbruck (57091)
 Blies-Ébersing (57092)
 Blies-Guersviller (57093)
 Bousseviller (57103)
 Breidenbach (57108)
 Éguelshardt (57188)
 Enchenberg (57192)
 Epping (57195)
 Erching (57196)
 Ernestviller (57197)
 Etting (57201)
 Frauenberg (57234)
 Goetzenbruck (57250)
 Grosbliederstroff (57260)
 Gros-Réderching (57261)
 Grundviller (57263)
 Guebenhouse (57264)
 Hambach (57289)
 Hanviller (57294)
 Haspelschiedt (57301)
 Hazembourg (57308)
 Hilsprich (57325)
 Holving (57330)
 Hottviller (57338)
 Hundling (57340)
 Ippling (57348)
 Kalhausen (57355)
 Kappelkinger (57357)
 Kirviller (57366)
 Lambach (57376)
 Lemberg (57390)
 Lengelsheim (57393)
 Liederschiedt (57402)
 Lixing-lès-Rouhling (57408)
 Loupershouse (57419)
 Loutzviller (57421)
 Meisenthal (57456)
 Montbronn (57477)
 Mouterhouse (57489)
 Nelling (57497)
 Neufgrange (57499)
 Nousseviller-lès-Bitche (57513)
 Obergailbach (57517)
 Ormersviller (57526)
 Petit-Réderching (57535)
 Philippsbourg (57541)
 Puttelange-aux-Lacs (57556)
 Rahling (57561)
 Rémelfing (57568)
 Rémering-lès-Puttelange (57571)
 Reyersviller (57577)
 Richeling (57581)
 Rimling (57584)
 Rohrbach-lès-Bitche (57589)
 Rolbing (57590)
 Roppeviller (57594)
 Rouhling (57598)
 Saint-Jean-Rohrbach (57615)
 Saint-Louis-lès-Bitche (57619)
 Sarralbe (57628)
 Sarreguemines (57631)
 Sarreinsming (57633)
 Schmittviller (57636)
 Schorbach (57639)
 Schweyen (57641)
 Siersthal (57651)
 Soucht (57658)
 Sturzelbronn (57661)
 Le Val-de-Guéblange (57267)
 Volmunster (57732)
 Waldhouse (57738)
 Walschbronn (57741)
 Wiesviller (57745)
 Willerwald (57746)
 Wittring (57748)
 Wœlfling-lès-Sarreguemines (57750)
 Woustviller (57752)
 Zetting (57760)

History

The arrondissement of Sarreguemines was created in 1800, disbanded in 1871 (ceded to Germany) and restored in 1919. In January 2000 it absorbed the canton of Sarralbe from the arrondissement of Forbach.

As a result of the reorganisation of the cantons of France which came into effect in 2015, the borders of the cantons are no longer related to the borders of the arrondissements. The cantons of the arrondissement of Sarreguemines were, as of January 2015:

 Bitche
 Rohrbach-lès-Bitche
 Sarralbe
 Sarreguemines
 Sarreguemines-Campagne
 Volmunster

References

Sarreguemines